Padure Parish is an administrative unit of Kuldīga Municipality in the Courland region of Latvia. The parish has a population of 1134 (as of 1/07/2010) and covers an area of 113.11 km2.

Villages of Padure parish 
 Deksne
 Keramika
 Ķimale
 Līzesmuiža
 Padure
 Sausgāļciems
 Vēgas

Notable sights and places 
 Padure Manor

See also 
 Curonian Kings

External links 
 Padure parish in Latvian

Parishes of Latvia
Kuldīga Municipality
Courland